Vincent Coulibaly is Guinean prelate of the Catholic Church. He is the Archbishop of Conakry (Guinea).

Biography 

Coulibaly was born in 1953 in Kiniéran, French Guinea.

In 1969 he attended the Jean-XXIII seminary of Kindia, Guinea, and in 1979 he entered the Grand Seminary Pierre-Claver de Koumi in Burkina-Faso.

In 1979, he was ordained as a deacon in the Diocese of Kankan and ordained a priest on May 8, 1981.

In 1993, he was appointed Bishop of Kankan, and in 1994 he was consecrated a bishop by Robert Sarah (Archbishop of Conakry).

After Pope John Paul II appointed Archbishop Sarah as Secretary of the Congregation for the Evangelization of Peoples, John Paul appointed Coulibaly to replace Sarah as Archbishop of Conakry on May, 6 2003.

References

Roman Catholic archbishops in Guinea
Guinean Roman Catholic bishops
1953 births
Living people